This is a list of flag bearers who have represented the Maldives at the Olympics.

Flag bearers carry the national flag of their country at the opening ceremony of the Olympic Games.

See also
Maldives at the Olympics

References

Flag bearers
Maldives
Olympic flagbearers